Marc Jurczyk (born 21 January 1996) is a German male track cyclist, representing Germany at international competitions. He competed at the 2016 UEC European Track Championships in the 1 km time trial event.

References

External links

1996 births
Living people
German male cyclists
German track cyclists
People from Böblingen
Sportspeople from Stuttgart (region)
Cyclists from Baden-Württemberg
21st-century German people